The 1999 Montreal Alouettes finished in first place in the East Division for the first time since 1979 with a 12–6 record. This was the last full season for Anthony Calvillo sharing the teams starting quarterbacking with Tracy Ham who retired after the season.. After a great season, they lost a close East Final to the Hamilton Tiger-Cats 27-26, again being denied a shot at playing for the Grey Cup.

Preseason

Regular season

Season Standings

Season Schedule

Roster

Playoffs

East Final

Awards

1999 CFL All-Star Selections
Ben Cahoon – Slotback
Barron Miles – Defensive Back
Uzooma Okeke – Offensive Tackle
Mike Pringle – Running Back
Pierre Vercheval – Offensive Guard

1999 CFL Eastern All-Star Selections
Ben cahoon – Slotback
Mike pringle – Running Back
Pierre vercheval – Offensive Guard
Uzooma okeke – Offensive Tackle
Jason Richards – Defensive Tackle
Elfrid Payton – Defensive End
Irvin Smith – Cornerback
Barron miles – Defensive Back

1999 Intergold CFLPA All-Star Selections

References

Montreal Alouettes
Montreal Alouettes seasons
1990s in Montreal
1999 in Quebec